Flowermix is a remix album by British Art rock band No-Man made by the band and selected underground remixers. It is a compilation of remixed and reworked songs from their Flowermouth album.

Track listing
All songs by Bowness / Wilson

Cassette

This version of "Flowermix", which was briefly available before being withdrawn in favor of the CD re-release, features two otherwise unavailable tracks – the instrumental version of "Babyship Blue" (complementing the full vocal version on "Heaven Taste") and "Witching Ovaries", an indie-psychedelic guitar-rock remix of "Watching Over Me".

Side A
 "Angeldust" (9:10)
 "Faith In You" (10:44)
 "All I See" (6:52)

Side B
 "Witching Ovaries" (4:48)
 "Heal the Madness" (6:51)
 "Babyship Blue" (4:59)
 "Sample" (9:00)

CD
 "Angeldust" (9:08)
 "Faith In You" (10:38)
 "All I See" (6:52)
 "Natural Neck" (5:20)
 "Heal the Madness" (6:51)
 "You Grow More Beautiful" (version) (4:21)
 "Sample" (8:57)
 "Why the Noise?" (4:04)
 "Born Simple" (12:03)

Personnel
Tim Bowness – vocals, words
Steven Wilson – instruments
Ben Coleman – violins (4,8)
Mel Collins – soprano saxophone (1), flute (8)
Robert Fripp – guitar (1), soundscapes (1,5,7,9)
David Kosten – production / remix (4,8)
Silas Maitland – bass loop (1)
Os – production / remix (3,7)
The Prophets Of Bliss – production / remix (2)

Release history

References

External links
No-Man's Official Website
No-Man's Fan Site
Steven Wilson – The Complete Discography (9th Edition)

No-Man albums
1995 remix albums